The BORSDORF to ZITTAU series of early, German tender locomotives were used by the Leipzig–Dresden Railway Company (Leipzig-Dresdner Eisenbahn-Compagnie or LDE) for mixed duties.

History
Between 1866 and 1868 the Leipzig-Dresden Railway had procured at total of 20 locomotives in 3 batches from the Maschinenfabrik Esslingen (Emil Keßler). They had a boiler with a rectangular dome, an inside Stephenson valve gear and Kirchweger condensers.

In LDE service the engines only sported names; no running numbers or classification was used. On being taken over by the Royal Saxon State Railways in 1876 they retained their names, as long as they were not duplicated elsewhere. In addition, they were given running numbers 584 to 603 and incorporated into Class K III. In 1885 the classification was changed to K II and in 1892 they were renumbered from 676 to 695.  In 1896 the classification changed again simply to II and in 1900 the running numbers were increased by 2000 and the name boards removed. Because the older engines were no long fully operational, the numbering was no longer sequential.

By 1913 the locomotives had been retired.

See also
 Royal Saxon State Railways
 List of Saxon locomotives and railbuses
 Leipzig–Dresden Railway Company

References

 
 

Locomotives of Saxony
2-4-0 locomotives
Esslingen locomotives
Railway locomotives introduced in 1866